Helen Isobel Aston (26 March 1934 – 17 March 2020) was an Australian botanist and ornithologist.

Biography 
Aston completed her Bachelor of Science in 1957 with majors in botany and zoology from the University of Melbourne.

Aston worked at the National Herbarium of Victoria from 1956 to 1991, where she became one of Australia's leading authorities on freshwater vascular plants. The National Herbarium of Victoria holds the majority of Aston's herbarium, almost 3,000 specimens, with duplicates distributed around Australian Herbaria including AD, BRI, CANB, HO, NE, NSW and PERTH.
 
Aston is probably best known for her book Aquatic Plants of Australia published in 1973 by Melbourne University Press.

Aston has represented Australian herbaria as the Australian Botanical Liaison Officer in 1974 with the Royal Botanic Gardens, Kew, United Kingdom.

Aston edited the in-house journal, Muelleria, from 1977 to 1988.

Standard author abbreviation

Selected published names
Limnophyton australiense Aston
Triglochin alcockiae Aston
Nymphoides triangularis Aston

 See also :Category:Taxa named by Helen Isobel Aston
and
Australian Plant Name Index

Awards and honours 
In 1979, Aston was awarded the Australian Natural History Medallion by the Field Naturalists Club of Victoria.

Selected publications

Books
 Aquatic Plants of Australia (1973)
 A bird atlas of the Melbourne Region (1978)

Journal articles

Legacy 
The following plants have been named in her honour:

Genera
Astonia S.W.L.Jacobs

Species
Nymphoides astoniae M.D.Barrett & R.L.Barrett

References 

1934 births
2020 deaths
20th-century Australian botanists
Botanists active in Australia
21st-century Australian botanists
University of Melbourne alumni
University of Melbourne women
Australian women botanists
Muelleria (journal) editors
20th-century Australian women
Australian Botanical Liaison Officers
Royal Botanic Gardens Victoria